Kourtnei Brown (born April 17, 1988) is a former American football outside linebacker He played college football at Clemson.

Professional career

San Francisco 49ers
In 2012 Brown was signed as an undrafted free agent, but a short time later he was released.

Washington Redskins
Later in 2012 Brown was signed by the Redskins' practice squad. In 2013, he was waived.

Buffalo Bills
In 2013 Brown was signed to the Bills' practice squad. On January 14, 2014, he was signed a future contract. On April 10, 2014, he was waived.

Detroit Lions
On April 11, 2014, Brown was claimed off waivers from the Bills. On May 30, 2014, he was waived by the Lions.

St. Louis Rams
On July 26, 2014, Brown was signed by the Rams. On August 30, 2014, he was waived. On September 11, 2014, he was signed to the Rams' practice squad. On September 30, 2014, he was released.

Houston Texans
On December 10, 2014, Brown was signed by the Texans' practice squad. On December 29, 2014, he was signed a future contract. On September 5, 2015, he was waived.

Tampa Bay Buccaneers
On September 6, 2015, Brown was claimed off waivers from the Texans. On September 22, 2015, he was waived. On September 24, 2015, he was signed to the Buccaneers' practice squad.

Houston Texans (second stint)
On September 30, 2015, Brown was signed from the Buccaneers' practice squad. On November 21, 2015, he was waived.

Tampa Bay Buccaneers (second stint)
On November 23, 2015, Brown was acquired off waivers from the Texans. On September 3, 2016, he was released by the Buccaneers as part of final roster cuts. He was re-signed to the practice squad on November 15, 2016. He was released on November 29, 2016.

Tennessee Titans
On December 28, 2016, Brown was signed to the Titans' practice squad. He signed a reserve/future contract with the Titans on January 2, 2017. He was waived/injured on August 17, 2017 and placed on injured reserve. He was released on August 24, 2017.

References

External links
Clemson Tigers bio
Houston Texans bio

1988 births
Clemson Tigers football players
Living people
Players of American football from Charlotte, North Carolina
Spokane Shock players
San Francisco 49ers players
Washington Redskins players
Buffalo Bills players
Detroit Lions players
St. Louis Rams players
Houston Texans players
Tampa Bay Buccaneers players
Tennessee Titans players